Gustav Frederik Holm (6 August 1849 – 13 March 1940) was a Danish naval officer and Arctic explorer born in Copenhagen.

Career
He was made commander in the navy in 1899, was chief of the hydrographic bureau from 1899 to 1909, and became director of pilots in 1912. He became distinguished for his explorations, especially of the east coast of Greenland. In 1876, he participated in K. J. V. Steenstrup's geological expedition to the Julianehåb District. From 1883 to 1885 he led the Umiak Expedition with T. V. Garde, exploring the east coast of Christian IX Land, as far as 66° 8' N using umiak boats. The expedition encountered 11 Inuit communities, numbering 431 inhabitants, who were previously unknown to Europeans, and discovered five great ice fiords. For his explorations he received gold medals from the Société de géographie, Paris (1891), and the Danish Geographical Society (1895), and the Danish Order of Merit (1909). The results and observations of the expeditions were published in Den danske Konebaads-Expedition til Grønlands Østkyst 1883–85 (1889) and Om de geografiske Forhold i dansk Østgrønland (1889).

Posthumous honours
Cape Gustav Holm, Holm Island (Kiatassuaq) and Holm Land were named after him.

Literature

See also 
Cartographic expeditions to Greenland
List of Arctic expeditions
Ammassalik wooden maps

References

 

Scandinavian explorers of North America
Greenlandic polar explorers
Danish polar explorers
Danish male writers
1849 births
1940 deaths
Place of death missing
Burials at the Garrison Cemetery, Copenhagen